The Next Thing You Eat is a 2021 six episode documentary series hosted by chef David Chang. The series explores the food production industry and the changes to the industry caused by new technology and was released on October 21, 2021.

References

External links
 The Next Thing You Eat at IMDb

2021 American television series debuts
2020s American documentary television series
Hulu original programming